The 1978–79 season was the 70th year of football played by Dundee United, and covers the period from 1 July 1978 to 30 June 1979. United finished in third place, securing UEFA Cup football for the following season.

Match results
Dundee United played a total of 41 competitive matches during the 1978–79 season.

Legend

All results are written with Dundee United's score first.
Own goals in italics

Premier Division

Scottish Cup

League Cup

UEFA Cup

League table

References

See also
 1978–79 in Scottish football

Dundee United F.C. seasons
Dundee United